Hugh V (died 1335), a Catalan nobleman and military leader, was the twentieth viscount of Bas. He lived for a time in the Kingdom of Sicily, where he was appointed count of Squillace in Calabria. He is sometimes known by the diminutive Huguet (Italian: Ughetto, Spanish: Hugueto).

He was a younger son of Count Hugh V of Empúries and Sibil·la de Palau, viscountess of Bas. His brother, Ponç V, inherited Empúries in 1277 and was invested with Bas as heir of his mother in 1285. In 1291, he granted the viscounty of Bas to his brother Hugh. In 1300, King James II confiscated the viscounty because Hugh, as count of Squillace, was fighting for King Frederick III of Sicily. Frederick, James's brother, had been proclaimed king of Sicily by the nobility after James had signed the Treaty of Anagni (1295) turning Sicily over to the pope.

On 1 August 1302, Frederick asked his brother James to restore Hugh the lands he had confiscated. The following day, Queen Eleanor, sent a letter with an ambassador, Guillem Galceran de Cartellà, to James to second her husband's request. On 4 August, Eleanor, through Viscount Jaspert V de Castelnou, asked her sister, Blanche, who was James's queen, to intercede with James for the restoration of Hugh's domains. In 1331 the viscounty was sold to Hugh by Alfonso IV in exchange for 70,000 sous.

During his time in the service of Frederick III, Hugh was made lord of Paternò and count of Squillace. In 1302, when the king and queen were petitioning for the restoration of his lands in Spain, he held the high office of Grand Marshal of the kingdom.

An iron and silver bridle found in Turkey bearing the arms of the counts of Empúries may have belonged to the count of Squillace. In a letter dated 1298, Count Ponç V refers to his brother Hugh as a prisoner of the sultan of Egypt.

According to Jerónimo Zurita writing in the sixteenth century, at the battle of Capo d'Orlando on 4 July 1299, Frederick divided the command of his flagship, with Bernat Ramon de Ribelles in charge of the helm, Hugh of Squillace in charge at the prow and Garci Sánchez in charge of the standard and the knights. Later that year, Frederick removed Blasco I d'Alagona from the lordship of Catania and replaced him with Hugh.

Besides Bas, Hugh was lord of Beuda and Castellfollit in Catalonia. He sold the castle of Beuda to Viscount Dalmau VI de Rocabertí in 1299, In Hugh's absence in 1332, the viscount's mills were destroyed at Castellfollit. On 4 July, Alfonso IV authorised Hugh to investigate the matter and punish those responsible.

Marriage and descendants
Hugh was married to a woman named . He had an illegitimate son, Ramon, who died in 1326.

Notes

Sources

1335 deaths
Viscounts of Bas
Counts of Squillace
13th-century people from the Kingdom of Aragon
14th-century people from the Kingdom of Aragon